Raw Power is the third studio album by American rock band the Stooges (credited as Iggy and the Stooges), released on February 7, 1973 by Columbia Records. The album departed from the "groove-ridden, feel-based songs" of the band's first two records in favor of a more anthemic hard rock approach inspired by new guitarist James Williamson, who co-wrote the album's eight songs with singer Iggy Pop. Though not initially commercially successful, Raw Power gained a cult following in the years following its release and, like its predecessors The Stooges (1969) and Fun House (1970), is considered a forerunner of punk rock. 

The Guardian wrote that "it has since been acknowledged as one of the most influential records in rock history". The raw guitar sound of Williamson deeply influenced acts of different music genres such as the Sex Pistols, Johnny Marr of the Smiths and Kurt Cobain of Nirvana.

Background 
After their first two albums The Stooges (1969) and Fun House (1970) were released to little commercial success, the Stooges were in disarray: the band had officially broken up, bassist Dave Alexander was fighting alcoholism, and singer Iggy Pop's heroin addiction was escalating prior to the intervention of David Bowie. Pop later recalled, "very few people recognized the quality of the Stooges' songwriting, it was really meticulous. And to his credit, the only person I'd ever known of in print to notice it, among my peers of professional musicians, was Bowie. He noticed it right off." Having signed on as a solo artist to Columbia Records, Pop relocated to London, where he was to write and record an album with James Williamson, who served as the Stooges' second guitarist from late 1970 until the band's initial dissolution in July 1971. When they failed to find a suitable English rhythm section, Williamson suggested that former Stooges Ron Asheton and Scott Asheton fly over and participate in the recording sessions, leading to the band's reformation under the new name of "Iggy and the Stooges". Although he was the band's founding guitarist, the elder Asheton reluctantly agreed to switch to electric bass.

Recording 
Initial demo sessions were held at RG Jones Studios in Wimbledon with sound engineer Gerry Kitchingham and at Olympic Studios in Barnes with sound engineer Keith Harwood, with most of the songs rejected by the band's management. Pop said that Columbia executives insisted on two ballads, one for each side of the album: "Gimme Danger" and "I Need Somebody". The album itself was recorded at CBS Studios in London with staff engineer Mike Ross-Trevor from September 10 to October 6, 1972. Pop produced and mixed the album by himself; unfortunately, his botched first attempt mixed most of the instruments into one stereo channel and the vocals into the other, with little regard for balance or tone quality. Tony Defries, the head of Bowie's management company MainMan, informed Pop that the album would be remixed by Bowie. Pop agreed to this, claiming that "the other choice was I wasn't going to get my album out. I think Defries told me that CBS refused to release it like that, I don't know", but insisted that his own mix for "Search and Destroy" be retained. Due to budgetary constraints, Bowie remixed the other seven songs in a single day at Los Angeles' Western Sound Recorders in October 1972. Pop said of the production:

Bowie later recalled:

However when Morgan Neville's documentary film on Raw Power was released in 2010, they demonstrated that each individual instrument was indeed recorded on its own track on the original multi-track tapes, suggesting that Bowie was either mistaken or working with a copy that had mixed down the instruments on to the same track.

Alternate mixes 

Low-fidelity copies of Pop's original mixes circulated among fans for years. In 1993, a selection of these original mixes was released by Bomp Records as Rough Power. Fans and critics generally agreed that the original mixes were interesting, but not necessarily superior to Bowie's efforts. Of the Rough Power release, Pop has remarked that "what David and I came up with at these sessions was better than that."

In 1996, Columbia Records "invited" Pop to remix the entire album for re-release on CD. Pop said in the liner notes that had he declined, the studio would have remixed it without his blessing. Pop cited longtime encouragement from fans and peers, the existence of Rough Power, his distaste for how the original 1989 CD release of Raw Power sounded, and the fact that Columbia would release the new mix on its subsidiary Legacy Recordings as factors that led him to go through with the new mix, which was undertaken at New York's Sony Music Studios in 1996. The remixed edition was released on April 22, 1997. In the album's accompanying liner notes, Pop states the following:

American music journalist and essayist Robert Christgau wrote approvingly of Pop's Raw Power remix. Upon reviewing the 1997 edition of Raw Power, Christgau – who in the past had complained about how Bowie had mixed the original album "down till it's thin as an epicure's wrist" and inflicted "ruinous underbassing" – wrote, 

On the other hand, some fans – among them guitarist Robert Quine – felt that the new remix was as unfaithful to the material as the original 1973 mix, and further criticized the audible distortion in the new mix. Quine said, "[Iggy's] one of the greats but I wonder about what he did to that record with the new [Raw Power] remix, which is atrocious. 'With this remix, I think this can stand up with the latest Smashing Pumpkins.' Wow." In the reissued CD's liner notes, however, Pop points out that one of his intentions in doing the new mix was to keep audio levels in the red (which would deliberately cause such distortion) while at the same time making the music more "powerful and listenable". This new version is arguably the "loudest album ever", reaching RMS of -4 dB, rare even by today's standards.

James Williamson and Ron Asheton have both stated that they prefer Bowie's original mix of the album over Pop's remixed version. Williamson stated:

Asheton stated:

In 2002, Bowie said that his original mix of Raw Power is "the version I still prefer over the later remix – it has more wound-up ferocity and chaos and, in my humble opinion, is a hallmark roots sound for what was later to become punk." 

In 2010, Pop remarked,

Pop and Bowie's mixes were both remastered in 2012 for a Record Store Day double LP by Kevin Gray and Mark Wilder, respectively; this remastering was free of clipping.

In 2023, both mixes of the album were once again remastered, free of clipping, along with the release of a new edition of the album to commemorate its fiftieth anniversary.

Musical style 
Raw Power has often been classified as a proto-punk or garage rock album. According to Brett Callwood, it abandoned the "groove-ridden, feel-based songs" of the band's first two albums in favor of a more anthemic hard rock approach inspired by Williamson, who co-wrote the album's eight songs with Pop. Similarly, music critic Joe S. Harrington said that the hard rock album demonstrated a "totally overpowering" sound, "a sledgehammer attack of brutal ill will", while author Dave Thompson noted Pop's "nihilistic hard rock bellowing" throughout. In another analysis, PopMatters writer Iain Ellis said the album can be seen in retrospect as punk metal, while Tucson Weeklys Jarret Keene deemed it "garage-punk-metal" fusion.

Marketing and sales 
Raw Power was released on February 7, 1973 under the moniker of "Iggy and the Stooges", in contrast to the band's first two albums, which were credited to "the Stooges". The cover is a photograph of Pop taken by rock music photographer Mick Rock. The songs "Search and Destroy" and "Shake Appeal" were both released as singles (the title track was released as a single in Japan only). According to Robert Hilburn, the album was "far too radical for the corporate-rock sensibilities of radio" in 1973, and as a result it only charted for three weeks on the Top 200, peaking at number 183. The group continued touring for about a year, but Columbia dropped their contract. The Stooges were also dumped by MainMan – Tony Defries lost patience with the band after the large sum of money he advanced to them was spent on drugs. The Stooges broke up in February 1974. After spending time in a drug-fueled stupor in L.A. – and later rehab at the UCLA Neuropsychiatric Institute – Pop re-joined Bowie's entourage, and emerged as a solo artist in 1976.

Critical reception 

Raw Power received much praise from contemporary critics. Dave Marsh proclaimed that it was already "the best album of the '70s", as Pop had "summed everything up and it took him only nine songs to do it." Ben Edmunds from Phonograph Record called it "an experience so overpowering that it forces new definitions for even the most familiar things", arguing in March that it will undoubtedly be the album of the year. According to Lester Bangs, the "by-now banal words 'heavy metal' were invested for this group", while "the ferocious assertiveness of the lyrics is at once slightly absurd and indicative of a confused, violently defensive stance that's been a rock tradition from the beginning". In Stereo Review, he called the album a "comeback of major proportions" and "monomaniacal fury so genuine" that it may be too overwhelming for listeners, concluding that, "whether you laugh at them or accept their chaotic rumble on its own terms, they're fascinating and authentic, the apotheosis of every parental nightmare." Reviewing Raw Power for Rolling Stone, Lenny Kaye praised its uncompromising music and said, "for the first time, the Stooges have used the recording studio as more than a recapturing of their live show, and with David Bowie helping out in the mix, there is an ongoing swirl of sound that virtually drags you into the speakers". Longtime Stooges fans were less receptive to Bowie's mix for the original album; Robert Christgau later wrote of the original fan response, "first-generation Iggyphiles charged just as indignantly that David Bowie had mixed the real thing way too thin, before it was anointed the Platonic idea of rock and roll by desperate young men who didn't have much else to choose from".

Along with the Stooges' first two albums, Raw Power came to be regarded as an important proto-punk record in the years following its release. Writing of the album in retrospect, Will Hodgkinson believed that while the band's debut was "charged and brutal garage-rock" and Fun House was "lurid chaos", Raw Power was more musically sophisticated "in its debauchery". In The Trouser Press Guide to New Wave Records, Scott Isler credited Williamson's writing contributions with providing more musicality and structure to the band's songs, whose lyrics conflated sex and death. He regarded the album as "heavy metal in every sense" and "another masterpiece" from the group. Greg Kot also believed Raw Power was "another masterpiece-more heavy metal than punk", with songs more "structured but no less forceful". Nick Kent said in 2010 that Raw Power remains "the greatest, meanest-eyed, coldest-blooded hard rock tour de force ever summoned up in a recording studio". Christgau was somewhat less impressed. In his 1981 book Christgau's Record Guide: Rock Albums of the Seventies, he praised Williamson's guitar playing while writing that the side-opening tracks "Search and Destroy" and the title song "voice the Iggy Pop ethos more insanely (and aggressively) than 'I Wanna Be Your Dog'", but felt that "the rest disperses in their wake" and that Bowie had mixed the record too thinly.

Raw Power has frequently appeared on professional listings of the greatest albums. Pitchfork named it the 83rd best album of the 1970s. In 2003, it was ranked number 125 on Rolling Stones "The 500 Greatest Albums of All Time" list, and 128 in a 2012 revised list. Based on such rankings, the aggregate website Acclaimed Music lists Raw Power as the 126th most acclaimed album in history.

1997 remix 

Raw Powers 1997 remix also received positive reviews. Writing that year in Entertainment Weekly, David Browne believed it rectified "one of rock's most exciting, but worst-recorded, audio assaults", and found it "as collar grabbing as the Stooges' skin-scratching rage itself", improving upon past releases of the album, in which "the guitars were too loud, [and] the drums buried." Hilburn gave the remix a rave review in the Los Angeles Times, writing that it "simply presents greater instrumental clarity and definition" than previous mixes and concluded, "It may have taken all these years to get the album right, but it has finally arrived." Tim Stegall from The Austin Chronicle said while the original mix "was so muted that it sounded like Vietnam being fought inside a Kleenex box", the remix is comparable to an atomic bombing and, "with its sonic gonads now fully restored, it can be further stated Raw Power is the single most dangerous rock & roll album ever made. Before or since." Christgau remained qualified in his praise. Reviewing the reissue in the Village Voice, he said "the pumped bass and vocals Iggy has uncovered on the original tapes" to be a "quantum improvement" over the original mix, but still found fault with the slower songs, "which like all of Iggy's slow ones are not as good as his fast ones, stand between a statement of principle and a priceless work of art." Nonetheless, he ranked it as the ninth best reissue of the year in his list for the 1997 Pazz & Jop critics' poll.

According to Pitchfork journalist Stuart Berman, Pop's remix of Raw Power "horrified audiophiles with a distaste for digital distortion". Christgau observed, "strict constructionists and lo-fi snobs charge indignantly that by remixing his own album Iggy has made a mockery of history and done irreparable damage to a priceless work of art." In Berman's opinion, "after spending the past 13 years having my ears ravaged by the '97 Iggy mix, I find it difficult readjusting to the leaner, original version—even with the remastering, the '97 version far outstrips it in fidelity and sheer brute force, and remains a better entry point for younger listeners seeking to understand the album's impact."

Legacy and influence 
Raw Power has been credited by many sources for pioneering punk rock, although Paste magazine's Lizzie Manno adds that it has "also been cited as a major influence on heavy metal and hard rock". According to Ted Maider of Consequence of Sound, Raw Power is "by far the most important punk record ever", while Diffuser.fm writer James Stafford said, "One can make a reasonable argument for whether Raw Power or its predecessor, Fun House, lays claim to 'first punk record' status." DIYs Jonathan Hatchman wrote, "Above all, the reason that Raw Power should be regarded as, at least, one of the greatest punk albums of all time, is the influence it has provided. Without it, punk may have never even happened."

Steve Jones from the Sex Pistols once claimed that he learned to play guitar by taking speed and playing along to Raw Power. Johnny Marr of The Smiths cited it as his all-time favorite record: "It gave me a path to follow as a guitar player. It was an opening into a world of rock & roll, sleaze, sexuality, drugs, violence and danger. That's a hard combination to beat". He has also commented on James Williamson's guitar playing on the album: "I'm his biggest fan. He has the technical ability of Jimmy Page without being as studious, and the swagger of Keith Richards without being sloppy. He's both demonic and intellectual, almost how you would imagine Darth Vader to sound if he was in a band." Talking more about the album, Marr considered Iggy Pop "as the greatest rock'n'roll singer of all time". Thurston Moore of Sonic Youth said that it was one of the albums that shaped his life and music: "that record sliced my head off. The aggression and psychosexual imagery were really mysterious and alluring. In a way, it brought me into all those other aspects of music and literature that were really intriguing, like William S. Burroughs and the Beat Generation."

Singer and guitarist Kurt Cobain of the band Nirvana wrote in his Journals numerous times that Raw Power was his favorite album of all time. In his list of the top 50 albums he thought were most influential to Nirvana's sound entered in his journal in 1993, Raw Power appears in the number one slot. Henry Rollins of Black Flag has "Search & Destroy" tattooed across his shoulder blades. He has said that Raw Power is his second favorite Stooges album (after Fun House), calling it "America's greatest contribution to the hard rock scene", to compete with the "Stones, Zeppelins and the Deep Purples". Former Smiths frontman Morrissey once described "Search and Destroy" as "great" and "a very LA song". Mötley Crüe founder Nikki Sixx has cited it as a major influence: "When I was fifteen years old, I remember Iggy and the Stooges' song 'Search and Destroy' reaching out from my speakers to me like my own personal anthem." "I got into the heavier guitar stuff I was going through that adolescent anger thing. It’s a common story but mine was also fuelled by a father and a mother that were gone, and not really knowing where I fit into society. That song really connected with me". Guitarist John Frusciante of Red Hot Chili Peppers also praised the record: “when you think about all the ways bands these days try and expand rock and roll, most of them look pretty silly next to Raw Power. That is a definitive statement". CeeLo Green cited Raw Power as one of his favorite albums, stating that it "seems like it's all done in one take. 'Let's do that one, leave it, just try something else'. With his energy on stage, it seems as if the studio was just destroyed after that album – or at least you'd like to believe that".

The album's songs have been frequently covered. Prominent versions include the Dictators', Red Hot Chili Peppers', Dead Boys', Shotgun Messiah's, and Def Leppard's covers of "Search and Destroy", Guns N' Roses' cover of the title track on The Spaghetti Incident?, and Ewan McGregor covering "Gimme Danger" for the film Velvet Goldmine, which tells the story of a character based around David Bowie's Ziggy Stardust during the 1970s glam rock era. "Gimme Danger" was also covered by Pixies frontman Frank Black for the game Ghost Recon Advanced Warfighter 2. A cover of "Search and Destroy" by Emanuel also appeared on the soundtrack to Tony Hawk's American Wasteland. Additionally, a cover of the album's namesake track "Raw Power" was performed by Romeo Delta in StarCraft II: Wings of Liberty.

In May 2010, Pop, Williamson, Mike Watt, Scott Asheton, and Steve Mackay performed Raw Power in its entirety as part of the All Tomorrow's Parties-curated Don't Look Back series.

Track listing

Original release

Deluxe edition 

Disc two – Georgia Peaches (Live at Richards, Atlanta, Georgia, October 1973)

 "Introduction"
 "Raw Power"
 "Head On"
 "Gimme Danger"
 "Search and Destroy"
 "I Need Somebody"
 "Heavy Liquid"
 "Cock in My Pocket"
 "Open Up and Bleed"
 "Doojiman" (Outtake from the session for Raw Power)
 "Head On" (Rehearsal performance) (from CBS Studios Rehearsal Tape)

Disc three – Rarities, Outtakes & Alternates from the Raw Power Era

 "I'm Hungry"
 "I Got a Right"
 "I'm Sick of You"
 "Hey, Peter"
 "Shake Appeal"
 "Death Trip"
 "Gimme Danger"
 "Your Pretty Face Is Going to Hell"

Bonus DVD
 Documentary by Morgan Neville
 Live performance footage from Festival Planeta Terra, São Paulo, Brazil - November 2009

2010 reissue 
A remastered version of David Bowie's original mix along with a second disc of unreleased live tracks and soundchecks, including a live soundboard recording from Atlanta in October 1973, and liner notes written by Brian J. Bowe, was released in 2010. On April 13, 2010, a deluxe version titled Raw Power: The Masters Edition was released, consisting of three CDs, one DVD, one 7" vinyl record, a booklet, and a pack of photo prints.

2012 Record Store Day reissue 
Raw Power saw a limited vinyl re-release for Record Store Day on April 21, 2012. The release included two LPs (one containing the remastered 1973 Bowie mix and the other containing a remastered version of the 1997 Pop mix) and a sixteen-page commemorative booklet with quotes from the band, pictures of the band from photographer Mick Rock at their infamous King's Cross Cinema show in the summer of 1972, and written pieces by British journalist Kris Needs and rock 'n roll historian Brian J. Bowe.

Personnel 
The Stooges
 Iggy Pop – lead vocals, celesta on "Penetration", piano on "Gimme Danger" and "Raw Power", tambourine on "Your Pretty Face is Going to Hell" and "Raw Power", backing vocals on "Raw Power", production and mixing for 1997 reissue
 James Williamson – guitar, backing vocals on "Penetration"
 Ron Asheton – bass guitar, backing vocals on "Penetration" and "Raw Power" 
 Scott Asheton – drums

Additional musicians
 David Bowie – mixing (1973 version)
 Bruce Dickinson – executive production on 1997 reissue

References

Sources

External links 
 
 Stream the entire album for free on The Stooges' official website
Four-part series podcast on how the album was made and how it influenced future generations of punk rockers 

The Stooges albums
Columbia Records albums
Legacy Recordings albums
Au Go Go Records albums
Glam rock albums
Albums produced by David Bowie
Albums with cover art by Mick Rock
1973 albums